Anukta (Kannada:ಅನುಕ್ತ; English: Unexpressed) is an 2019 Indian Kannada language Suspense thriller directed by Ashwath Samuel. This movie is produced by Harish Bangera under Deyi Production. Nobin Paul has worked on music as well as background music for the film. The film stars Karthik Attavar and Sangeeta Bhat in the lead roles. Supported by Sampath Raj, Anu Prabhakar, K S Sridhar, Usha Bhadaru, Lakshmi Siddaiah and many others are also seen in pivotal roles in the film.

Background
The film was shot in the Udupi and Dakshina Kannada districts. Based in Bengaluru, the film's teaser was released on 1 February 2019.

Synopsis
Anukta movie which revolves around a crime investigation of a murder mystery. Daivakola a divine culture of Tulunadu plays an interesting part in the film. With perspective narration in the screenplay movie keeps the audience guessing about the big surprises with the proper blend of psychological aspects of human emotions in the form of dreams and crime investigation of an intelligent COP behind a murder mystery.

Cast
 Sampath Raj 
 Anu Prabhakar
 Karthik Attavar
 Sangeetha Bhat
 Usha Bhandari
 Lakshmi Siddaiah
 KS Sridhar
 Roshan Shetty

Soundtrack

References
6 https://gulfnews.com/entertainment/south-indian/kannada-film-anukta-is-a-mystery-thriller-1.62029634

External links
   
https://in.bookmyshow.com/movies/anukta/ET00086871

Indian thriller films
2010s Kannada-language films
2019 thriller films